Palaeospongillidae is a family of extinct sponges with three genera and three species:
 †Eospongilla Dunagan, 1999
 †Eospongilla morrisonensis Dunagan, 1999
 †Lutetiospongilla Richter & Wuttke, 1999
 †Lutetiospongilla heili Ritcher & Wuttke, 1999
 †Palaeospongilla Ott & Volkheimer, 1972
 †Palaeospongilla chubutensis Ott & Volkheimer, 1972

References

Sponge families
Heteroscleromorpha